Martin Byford (born 27 May 1972) is a British racing driver from Colchester. He competed in the BTCC in 2011 for AmD Milltek. He is currently driving for BPM Motorsport in the 2019 Dunlop Endurance Championship with Ashley Woodman.

Racing career
Byford began racing in single seaters, mainly in Formula Ford and Formula 3 cars. He later moved onto tin tops, racing in several club series.

He moved into the British GT Championship in 2000, where he achieved a few podium finishes. For 2001 he raced in the Renault Clio Cup UK, finishing 3rd in the championship after a successful debut season. Byford remained in the championship for 2002, however he only managed 4th position in the championship.

Byford's next championship titles were the 2003 Super Coupe Cup and 2005 Mazda MX5 Championship. In 2006 he returned to the Clio Cup and finished 5th in the championship, in 2007 he won the championship despite not winning a race.

2008 saw Byford move into the Seat Cupra Cup, where he finished 3rd in the championship after achieving three wins.

Budget issues prevented Byford from racing full-time for the next few seasons, until he was given the chance to race for AmD Milltek in the BTCC after their previous driver Tom Onslow-Cole left the team.

Byford signed with Team Bullrun in the Britcar British Endurance Championship after he was unable to raise the necessary funds to continue racing in the BTCC.

For the 2019 season of Britcar, Byford was again entered to race with BPM Motorsport after a successful 2018 season with Ash Woodman in a CUPRA León TCR.

Byford will compete in the Britcar Endurance Championship, for the sixth time in a row and the fourth in the CUPRA León TCR, continuing with Ash Woodman for EDF Motorsports.

Racing record

Complete British GT Championship results
(key) (Races in bold indicate pole position) (Races in italics indicate fastest lap)

Complete British Touring Car Championship results
(key) (Races in bold indicate pole position – 1 point awarded just in first race) (Races in italics indicate fastest lap – 1 point awarded all races) (* signifies that driver lead race for at least one lap – 1 point awarded all races)

Complete Britcar results 
(key) (Races in bold indicate pole position in class – 1 point awarded just in first race; races in italics indicate fastest lap in class – 1 point awarded all races;-

Complete British Endurance Championship results 
(key) (Races in bold indicate pole position in class – 1 point awarded just in first race; races in italics indicate fastest lap in class – 1 point awarded all races;-

References

External links
BTCC official site

Living people
English racing drivers
1972 births
British Touring Car Championship drivers
British GT Championship drivers
British Formula Three Championship drivers
Britcar drivers
24H Series drivers
Renault UK Clio Cup drivers